Ralph Milbanke may refer to:

 Sir Ralph Milbanke, 4th Baronet (died 1748), of the Milbanke baronets
 Sir Ralph Milbanke, 5th Baronet (1725–1798)
 Sir Ralph Noel, 6th Baronet (born Ralph Milbanke, died 1825), MP for County Durham
 Sir Ralph Mark Milbanke, 12th Baronet (1907–1949), of the Milbanke baronets